The 2008–09 Ohio Bobcats men's basketball team represented Ohio University in the college basketball season of 2008–09. The team was coached by John Groce in his first season and played their home games at the Convocation Center. They finished the season 15–17 and 7–9 in MAC play to finish last in the MAC East.

Roster

Coaching staff

Preseason
The preseason poll was announced by the league office on October 30, 2008. Ohio was picked fifth in the MAC East

Preseason men's basketball poll
(First place votes in parenthesis)

East Division
 Kent State (16) 124
  (6) 109
 Bowling Green 70
 Akron 67
 Ohio
 Buffalo 35

West Division
 Western Michigan (15) 122
 Eastern Michigan (7) 105
 Central Michigan 79
  71
 Ball State 55
 Northern Illinois 39

Tournament champs
Kent State (11), Miami (7), Bowling Green (2), Eastern Michigan (2)

Preseason All-MAC 

Source

Schedule 

|-
!colspan=9 style=| Exhibition

|-
!colspan=9 style=| Regular Season

|-
!colspan=9 style=| MAC Tournament

|- style="background:#f9f9f9;"
| colspan=10 | *Non-Conference Game.  #Rankings from AP Poll.  All times are in Eastern Time Zone.
|}

Statistics

Team Statistics
Final 2008–09 Statistics

Source

Player statistics

Source

Awards and honors

All-MAC Awards 

Source

References

Ohio Bobcats men's basketball seasons
Ohio
Bob
Bob